Prineville Lake Acres is a census-designated place (CDP) in Crook County, Oregon, United States. It was first listed as a CDP prior to the 2020 census.

It is surrounded by the Juniper Canyon CDP.

Demographics

References 

Census-designated places in Crook County, Oregon
Census-designated places in Oregon